CSPD ([3-(1-chloro-3'-methoxyspiro[adamantane-4,4'-dioxetane]-3'-yl)phenyl] dihydrogen phosphate) is a chemical substance with formula C18H22ClO7P.  It is a component of enhanced chemiluminescence enzyme-linked immunosorbent assay (ELISA) kits, used for the detection of minute amounts of various substances such as proteins.

The molecule CSPD has the following functional groups in the structure: phosphate group, hydroxyl group, phenyl group, spiro group, ether group, methyl group, chlorine group. The ones worth noting are the ones above. None of these groups carry a charge. If there was a charge this would have had a change in the compounds pH, 3D structure, mass and bond angles. The toxin CSPD effect persister cell formation using MqsR (MqsR, a crucial regulator for quorum sensing and biofilm formation, is a GCU-specific mRNA interferase in Escherichia coli) and persister cells are cells that avoid stress and are characterized by reduced metabolism and other factors.

References

Chemiluminescence
Adamantanes
Dioxetanes
Organic peroxides
Organochlorides
Organophosphates
Phenol esters
Spiro compounds